1,2-Cyclohexanedione is an organic compound with the formula (CH)(CO).  It is one of three isomeric cyclohexanediones.  It is a colorless compound that is soluble in a variety of organic solvents.  It can be prepared by oxidation of cyclohexanone by selenium dioxide.  The enol is about 1 kcal/mol more stable than the diketo form.

Numerous diimine and dioxime ligands have been prepared from this diketone.  It condenses with 1,2-diamines to give diaza heterocycles.

References

Diketones
Cyclic ketones